Fustius sterlingi is a moth of the family Erebidae first described by Michael Fibiger in 2010. It is known from Hong Kong.

Its wingspan is 7.5-9.5 mm. The head, patagia, anterior part of tegulae, prothorax, basal part of the costa and costal upper patch of the medial area are black. The forewing ground colour in males is light grey, except for  black in the medial area. In females it is black brown and especially dark in the medial area. The crosslines are all present, although the subterminal line is weak. The terminal line is marked by black interneural dots. The hindwing is light grey in males and grey in females, with an indistinct discal spot. The underside of the forewing is grey. The underside of the hindwing is light grey, with an indistinct discal spot.

References

Micronoctuini
Moths described in 2010
Taxa named by Michael Fibiger